Söyembikä Tower, also called the Khan's Mosque, is probably the most familiar landmark and architectural symbol of Kazan.

Once the highest structure of that city's kremlin, it used to be one of the so-called leaning towers. Diverse stabilization methods were used to straighten the tower in the 1930s and 1990s, and it no longer leans.

The tower's construction date is enshrouded in mystery. Several scholars date its construction to the turn of the 18th century, when tiered towers were exceedingly popular in Russia. 

A legend postulates that the tower was built more than a century earlier by Ivan the Terrible's artisans in just a week's time. As the legend goes, the Kazan queen Söyembikä threw herself down from the highest tier, hence the name. 

Some scholars believe that the tower may date further back than the 18th century. If the tower really reflects some original features of Tatar architecture, then its design should have certainly influenced that of the Kremlin towers in Moscow. 

According to scholar Ravil Bukharaev, the need for the tower, which was built as a military watchtower is questionable. He stated that the region was in relative peace at the time and another existing tower already existed next to the Blagoveshchensky Cathedral. He claims that if the tower was built in the 18th century by the Russians, it would have proved superfluous and expensive to construct another for such purpose. Additionally, he cites the Islamic influence of the tower's architecture as being uncharacteristic if it was of Russian origin. Supporters of the theory point out that the only similar structures were built in Central Asia, which was politically and culturally connected with the derelict Khanate of Kazan. Several facts point to the validity of this theory: the size of the masonry, the absence of documentary evidence supporting Russian building, the respect paid to the tower by the local Tatar population, and so forth.

In the Imperial period, the tower used to be topped with a double-headed eagle, which the Bolsheviks replaced with a red star. It is currently crowned with a Muslim crescent. In the early twentieth century, the architect Alexey Shchusev reproduced the structure's outline in the Kazan Rail Station of Moscow.

References

External links
 

Towers in Russia
Buildings and structures in Kazan
Inclined towers
Landmarks in Russia
Tourist attractions in Tatarstan
Brick buildings and structures
Cultural heritage monuments of federal significance in Tatarstan